The Re 620, Re 6/6 in the old numbering scheme, are six-axle, electric locomotives of the SBB-CFF-FFS, which were acquired as a replacement for the Ae 6/6 for heavy services on the Gotthardbahn. They are the most modern of the so-called "Gotthard locomotives".

Construction and Technology
To reach the necessary tractive effort, a construction comprising six driven axles was necessary. In order to still get good running characteristics in curves, they were built into three two-axle bogies instead of two three-axle bogies as on the Ae 6/6. The middle bogie can move sideways, and the three bogies are connected by elastic cross couplings. Two of the four prototypes were built with a split locomotive body, whereby the joint may only move on an horizontal transverse axis to allow for changes in gradient, similarly to the Rhaetian Railway Ge 6/6 II.

The other two prototypes got a softer secondary suspension instead of the joint, which proved to be so reliable in everyday use that all series locomotives were built this way. Nevertheless, the two prototypes with a split body are still in regular operation. The exterior design is similar to the Re 4/4II, as are the driver's controls and the conventional transformer technology with fixed running notches, which was applied for the last time for this locomotive. In contrast to the Re 4/4II, the Re 6/6 has two transformers (one power and one control transformer), which are mounted on the frame between the bogies. Due to the higher roof, the Re 6/6 looks more brawny than the Re 4/4II, especially when seen from the front side.

Operations
The Re 6/6 is equipped with multiple unit train control together with Re 4/4II, Re 4/4III, Re 4/4IV and RBe 540. In passenger traffic they pull heavy passenger trains over the Gotthard route (as an alternative to a double heading of Re 4/4). In freight traffic they are used all over Switzerland for heavy trains, on the Gotthard route very often together with an Re 4/4II or Re 4/4III. For heavier trains, up to 1600 tons are operationally feasible; an additional bank engine has to help push the train in order not to overload the couplers.

Locomotive 11638 was retired and scrapped in 1990 due to an accident. For the renumbering to the UIC-conforming new numbering scheme in 1992, only the still existing locomotives were considered, thus the 11638 got no new number any more. But the renumbering was never done consistently. During 2005, the UIC numbering scheme was reworked, and 620 001 (instead of 000) was defined to be the smallest number. To make things easy, the scrapped 11638 also got a new number, 620 038. About half a dozen locomotives bore the new numbers at the beginning of 2006.

After two locomotives were tentatively equipped with radio remote control for pushing trains on the Gotthard line (such that the locomotive pushing at the end of the train may be controlled by the engineer at the front), about 30 locomotives were equipped with it in 2000. To make them administratively distinguishable, they got the new designation Ref 6/6.

When SBB was divided into passenger services and freight, the first thirteen locomotives 11601–13 remained in the passenger division. On 1 January 2003 they were exchanged against Re 460. Now all remaining 88 locomotives are assigned to SBB Cargo. Due to the reassignment of the Re 460 to the passenger division, the Re 6/6 again dominate the freight traffic on the Gotthard line.

The locomotives are assigned to the workshops Erstfeld, Bellinzona and Lausanne (Lausanne: 2000, today unknown), revisions are done at the main workshop at Bellinzona.

Pictures

See also
 List of stock used by Swiss Federal Railways

References

 This article was mostly translated from the German language version of August 2006.

15 kV AC locomotives
Bo-Bo-Bo locomotives
Re 620
Electric locomotives of Switzerland
Standard gauge locomotives of Switzerland
Railway locomotives introduced in 1972